Dr. Samuel L. Banks High School was a public secondary school in Baltimore, Maryland, United States. It was part of the small schools initiative in order to consolidate larger schools into smaller learning environments.

Recent Move
In the 2006–2007 school year a number of BCPSS schools were shut down and forcibly relocated into different buildings or to close down completely due to the condition of some buildings. Dr. Samuel L. Banks High School was one of them. The school moved to 5001 Sinclair Lane from 2500 E. Northern Parkway. They moved into the building that was once occupied by Thurgood Marshall Middle School, while that school moved into portable buildings and phased out. Dr. Samuel L. Banks High School shared a campus with another high school, Thurgood Marshall High School. In its first year at the new location, the school's enrollment was 735; this decreased significantly to 561 during the next school year.  Baltimore City Public Schools determined the school would close for good after the 2008 school year.

Demographics & Enrollment

ATTENDANCE RATE

2007  83.5%

2006  85.5%

2005  73.1%

2004  85.7%

2003  83.3%

GRADUATION RATE

2008  94.4%

2007  60.98%

2006  77.36%

2005  72.41%

References

Public high schools in Maryland
Public schools in Baltimore
Defunct schools in Maryland